Edgar Allan Poe (1809–1849) was an American writer.

Poe or POE may also refer to:

Places
 Poe, Indiana, an unincorporated community in the US
 Poe, Alberta
 Poe, West Virginia
 17427 Poe, an asteroid
 Poe, a settlement in the Nzérékoré Prefecture, Guinea
 Poe (crater), a crater on Mercury

Science and technology
 Polyolester oil, synthetic oil used in some refrigeration compressors
 Polyoxyethylene

Computing
 Perl Object Environment, a library for event-driven multitasking for the Perl programming language
 Power over Ethernet (PoE), combining data and power supply via Ethernet cabling
 PowerOpen Environment, an open standard for running a Unix-based operating system on the PowerPC computer architecture
 Product of experts (PoE), a machine learning technique
 Poe, a mobile app contains a range of chatbots developed by Quora

Games
 Pillars of Eternity, a 2015 role playing game by Obsidian Entertainment
 Path of Exile, a 2013 action role playing game by Grinding Gear Games

People and characters
 Poe Ballantine (born 1955), American author
 Poe (singer) (born 1968), American singer/songwriter
 Poe (surname), a surname (and list of people with the name)
 Poe (mascot), a mascot of the Baltimore Ravens National Football League team
 Poe, a character in the series Ruby Gloom
 Poe, an AI character in the series Altered Carbon
 Poe, an uglydoll
 Poe, a ghost-like enemy in The Legend of Zelda series
 Poe Dameron, a Resistance pilot in the Star Wars sequel trilogy
 Poe De Spell, brother of Magica De Spell in Ducktales

Other uses
 Post-occupancy evaluation, of a building or space
 Port of entry, a place where one may lawfully enter a country
 Poe's law, which states that a sufficiently sophisticated parody of extremism is indistinguishable from the real thing
 Place of Employment, the address a repossessor, skip tracer, or process server will use to find a debtor or the debtor's collateral
 Poe Lock, one of the Soo Locks allowing access between Lake Superior and the lower Great Lakes, North America
 Jiaobei, wooden divination tools originating from China 
 Poe divination

See also
 Peace on Earth (disambiguation)
 Po (disambiguation)
 Purity of Essence (disambiguation)

English masculine given names